Berger des Nuages, Pastor de Nubes, or Cloud Shepherd is a work of art by Jean Arp just outside the Plaza Cubierta of the University City of Caracas.

Background
The Venezuelan architect and designer Carlos Raúl Villanueva began designing the University City of Caracas campus in the 1940s, beginning construction in the 1950s during a time of prevailing Modernism in Latin America.

Villanueva hired many artists from around the world to contribute works to the campus, including Arp.

Design and construction
The design is also known as Forme de Lutin (Gnome Shape), and the 3.2-metre sculpture has multiple smaller copies around the world. The sculpture in Caracas was based on one of the smaller forms, which were created in 1949, and was both cast in the Susse foundry and placed on the campus in 1954.

On developing the sculpture from its smaller design, Arp said in 1953:

It is said that Arp's creative influence for the sculpture was based on his reaction to the Second World War. The sculpture's wavy form simulates the natural curves of clouds, hills, and lakes, and expresses Arp's opposition to machines that caused wars. It has elements of Surrealism and Dada.

The sculpture sits just outside the Plaza Cubierta by the Aula Magna; behind it is a large ceramic mural by Mateo Manaure.

Appearance
The sculpture is described as a "large organic form with rounded, wavy protrusions [that are] more reminiscent of a strange, budding fruit". It has undergone preservation in the past, when Arp was alive to advise on how he should like it done. It was originally proposed that Arp gave the sculpture(s) its name after placement, as the shiny surface reflected the clouds passing above, but conservation efforts of Arp's works have shown that he does not like his sculptures to be reflective as this distracts from the lines in them.

See also

 List of artworks in University City of Caracas

Notes

References 

1954 sculptures
Ciudad Universitaria de Caracas